The 2019 Calderdale Metropolitan Borough Council election took place on 2 May 2019 to elect members of Calderdale Metropolitan Borough Council in England. This was on the same day as other local elections. One councillor was elected in each ward for a four-year term so the councillors elected in 2019 last stood for election in 2015. Each ward is represented by three councillors, the election of which is staggered, so only one third of the councillors were elected in this election. Before the election there was no overall control with a minority Labour administration. Following the election Labour, having gained four councillors, took control of the council with an overall majority of five seats.

In May 2019 Councillor Colin Peel defected from the Conservative Party to Change UK. After the dissolution of the party he retained his seat as an independent councillor.

In November 2019 Councillor Roger Taylor was suspended from the Conservative Party over alleged Islamophobic comments.

Council results

Council Composition
Prior to the election the composition of the council was:

After the election the composition of the council was:

Ward results

Brighouse ward

The incumbent was Scott Benton for the Conservative Party. Swing shown is Conservative against Labour.

Calder ward

The incumbent was Dave Young for the Labour Party. The swing shown is Labour against Green. The swing for Labour against Conservative, who were second in the previous election, is +4.8.

Elland ward

The incumbent was John Ford for the Conservative Party. The swing is for Labour against Conservative.

Greetland & Stainland ward

The incumbent was Chris Pearson for the Conservative Party who stood down at this election. The swing is for Liberal Democrats against Conservatives.

Hipperholme & Lightcliffe ward

The incumbent was David Kirton for the Conservative Party. The swing is Conservative against Labour.

Illingworth & Mixenden ward

The incumbent was Barry Collins for the Labour Party who stood down at this election. Swing is Labour against Conservative.

Luddendenfoot ward

   

The incumbent was Nicola May for the Conservative Party. The swing shown is Labour against Conservative

Northowram & Shelf ward

The incumbent was Roger Taylor for the Conservative party. The swing shown is Conservative against Labour.

Ovenden ward

The incumbent was Bryan Smith for the Labour Party. The swing is for Labour against Conservatives.

Park ward

The incumbent was Faisal Shoukat for the Labour Party. Swing shown is Labour against Conservative.

Rastrick ward

The incumbent was Chris Pillai for the Conservative Party. Swing is for Conservatives against Labour.

Ryburn ward

The incumbent was Robert Thornber for the Conservative Party. The swing shown is for the Independent, Robert Holden, against the Conservative Party. The swing for the Conservatives against Labour was -17.7.

Skircoat ward

The incumbent was Marcus Thompson for the Conservative Party who stood down at this election. Swing is for Labour against Conservative.

Sowerby Bridge ward

The incumbent was Mike Payne for the Conservative Party. Swing is Labour against Conservatives.

Todmorden ward

The incumbent was Carol Machell for the Labour Party who stood down at this election. Swing is for Labour against the Conservatives.

Town ward

The incumbent was Tim Swift for the Labour Party. Swing show is for Labour against the Conservatives.

Warley ward

The incumbent was James Baker for the Liberal Democrats. Swing shown is Liberal Democrats against Labour.

References

2019 English local elections
2019
2010s in West Yorkshire
May 2019 events in the United Kingdom